is a retired Japanese judoka.

Koga is from Kokura, Fukuoka and began judo at the junior high school days. In 1961, When he was a student of Nihon University, was chosen to represent Japan in the World Championship held in Paris and got a bronze medal.

Koga began working for the Yawata Steel after graduation from university in 1962.

Koga also participated All-Japan Championships 8 times and won a bronze medal in 1965.

Achievements
1959 - All-Japan University Championships 2nd
1960 - All-Japan University Championships 3rd
1961 - World Championships (Openweight only) 3rd
 - All-Japan University Championships 1st
1965 - All-Japan Championships (Openweight only) 3rd

References

Japanese male judoka
Sportspeople from Fukuoka Prefecture
1939 births
Living people
20th-century Japanese people